The Governor Nobre de Carvalho Bridge, also known as the Macau–Taipa Bridge, is a dual-lane two-way bridge connecting Macau Peninsula near Casino Lisboa and the island of Taipa at the northern slope of Taipa Pequena (Small Taipa Hill) crossing the former Baía da Praia Grande. It is the first bridge in Macau, to connect the peninsula and Taipa. It is locally known as "The Old Bridge".

The flag of Macau uses this bridge as an emblem.

History
The bridge was designed by Edgar Cardoso. Construction started in June 1970, during Portuguese rule. The middle of the bridge is raised over a distance of 1213 m to allow vessels to pass through a 73 m wide passage. Seen from a distance, this part of the bridge resembles a flat triangle. It is named after José Manuel de Sousa e Faria Nobre de Carvalho, the Governor of Macau from 25 November 1966, to 19 November 1974.

Due to the construction around Casino Lisboa, the bridge was temporarily closed in 2005. As of 2006, the bridge is open again, but only to buses, taxis, and emergency vehicles.

Architecture
The bridge is meant to take the shape of a dragon, with Casino Lisboa representing the dragon's head, and Taipa Monument on Taipa Pequena the dragon's tail.

See also

Transport in Macau

References

External links
Decree-Law No. 70/95/M, Regulations for the Nobre de Carvalho Bridge, Friendship Bridge and Access Viaducts – in Portuguese and in Chinese via the official website of the Printing Bureau.

Governador Nobre de Carvalho
Governador Nobre de Carvalho
Transport in Macau
1974 establishments in Macau